Hypocalymma cordifolium is a member of the family Myrtaceae. It is endemic to Western Australia. 

It blooms between September and February producing pink-white flowers.

It is found in seasonally wet areas or along creek beds along the coast in the Great Southern and South West regions of Western Australia where it grows in sandy to sandy-loam or sandy-peat soils over granite or laterite.

References

cordifolium
Endemic flora of Western Australia
Rosids of Western Australia
Plants described in 1844